Jackie Carter (June 28, 1953 – April 13, 2016) was an American children's author. Her goal was to provide children of all races with images of themselves in the books they read.

Early life and education
Carter was born on June 28, 1953, in Port Chester, New York. Both of her parents, William A. Carter and Earnestine Carter, were employees of the Middletown school district, and her father was the first African-American school principal there. Carter obtained a degree in early childhood education from Hampton University and a Master of Science in Educational Instructional Technology from New York University.

Career
Her first position in publishing was on Sesame Street Magazine, after which she joined Scholastic Corporation as editorial director of the early childhood division in 1985. Carter was named Editorial Director of Weston Woods/Scholastic New Media, which produced audiovisual works,  in 1995.

Among the positions she held in children's publishing were VP of Marvel Kids in 1997 and Editorial Director of Disney Global Children's Book Division. At Disney Carter was also Editorial Director of Jump at the Sun, an imprint highlighting African American culture. The imprint included Whoopi Goldberg's Sugar Plum Ballerina series, as well as the Willimena series by Valerie Wilson Wesley.

In 2004 she became vice president and publisher of Children's Press at the Scholastic Classroom and Library Group. She also participated in a reading and writing program at the University of Illinois at Chicago aimed at encouraging African-American boys to build self-esteem.

Bibliography
Levin, James, and Jackie Carter. Helping. New York: Scholastic, 1993. 
Carter, Jackie, and Nancy Poydar. Knock, Knock! New York, NY: Scholastic, 1993. 
Carter, Jackie, and James Young. One Night. New York: Scholastic, 1994.

Illness and death
Carter was diagnosed with Non-Hodgkin lymphoma in 2002, and died April 13, 2016. On learning that she had cancer she developed a photographic exhibit with Martin Mistretta at the Creative Arts Center for People with Cancer, in Manhattan, called The It Girl's Guide to Chemo.

References

1953 births
2016 deaths
20th-century African-American people
20th-century African-American women
21st-century African-American women writers
21st-century African-American writers
21st-century American women writers
21st-century American writers
African-American publishers (people)
American publishers (people)